Charlie Mann is a Scottish sports broadcaster and Public Relations guru who currently appears on Sportsound on BBC Radio Scotland as a match reporter and occasionally does trackside work.

Mann was the spokesman of Heart of Midlothian majority shareholder Vladimir Romanov until 2008.

Mann was head of communications for Scottish Labour for six months in 2018.

References

Scottish association football commentators
Living people
Heart of Midlothian F.C. non-playing staff
Scottish public relations people
Scottish radio personalities
Year of birth missing (living people)